Omorgus candezei is a species of hide beetle in the subfamily Omorginae.

References

candezei
Beetles described in 1872